Mount Atkinson is a suburb in Melbourne, Victoria, Australia,  northwest of the Melbourne central business district, located within the City of Melton local government area.

History

Mount Atkinson is situated in the Kulin nation traditional Aboriginal country. The Wathaurong and Woiwurrung people are local custodians within the Kulin nation. The suburb was gazetted and approved by the Victorian Government in 2017. Before its inception, the area was a part of Rockbank, Truganina and Mount Cottrell.

Development

Development in Mount Atkinson would include residential, educational facilities, a town centre, retail, parks and recreation, integrated industrial park, business precinct and a railway station. City of Melton has retained the postcode for Mount Atkinson.

Mt. Atkinson, Olivia and Grandview are the three housing estates in Mount Atkinson, and the largest of them is Mt. Atkinson by Stockland. Mt. Atkinson estate includes proposed facilities for the suburb, such as: Mount Atkinson train station, Westfield Mount Atkinson Town Centre, Edmund Rice Education's primary and secondary schools, a state primary school, a homemaker centre, a large business centre and commercial precinct, as well as the revitalised Skeleton Creek wetlands.

$3 million dollars worth of funding had been allocated for the Stage 1 construction of a Catholic Primary School located on Clara Avenue, with the school owned and operated under the umbrella of Edmund Rice Education Australia. The new school is expected to open in 2023.

The proposal to establish an entertainment premise of Mt. Atkinson Hotel was approved in March 2020, which is to be located on McKinley Drive. As a condition of approval, the expected completion of the hotel is to be by 31 August 2022.

A brand new Mt Atkinson Community and Children Centre opened its door for new enrolments in Term 1, 2023. The Mt Atkinson Children's and Community Centre offers free-kindergarten programs for three- and four-year-old children, adding over 300 early learning places to the local community.

Parks and Recreation

Proposed local parks and recreation reserves include the Mount Atkinson Nature Reserve with sporting and recreation facilities. Currently there are two active parks in the suburb; Grandview Dinosaur and Grizzly Bear Parks.

The suburb comprises a hill of the same name (which forms part of the Great Dividing Range in Australia), elevated at a peak of 140 meters above sea level and situated within the Mount Atkinson Nature Reserve. The reserve incorporates a dormant shield volcano of the same name. The volcanic cone and its geological properties are recognized as a nature sensitive site.

Transport
The Serviceton railway line passes through the northern edge of the suburb, which has a proposal to include a brand new Mount Atkinson station. Mount Atkinson station is proposed to be built near Greigs Road as an integrated transport hub next to Westfield Mt. Atkinson Town Centre.

In 2021, there was a plan to connect local residents to Rockbank station with a bus service.

Infrastructure Victoria released an Infrastructure Strategy report in August 2021, mentioning a new electrified metro service to Rockbank or alternatively to the Mount Atkinson Activity Centre. The report found that terminating a new electrified metro service at Mount Atkinson would encourage more gradual westward housing growth, compared with complete electrification to Melton. This has been disputed by PTUA Ballarat convener Ben Lever who argues that land along the rail corridor from Rockbank to Melton is already approved for development, under construction or built up regardless of electrification status.

Services on a newly electrified line would operate a cross city service to Pakenham East using the Melbourne Metro Tunnel, currently planned to service Pakenham to Sunbury. This extension of the electrified rail service would primarily meet demand from population growth around Mount Atkinson Activity Centre and the further western and south-eastern growth areas.

References

Suburbs of Melbourne
City of Melton